Joel Hintz (born 11 July 1996) is a New Zealand rugby union player, who currently plays as a prop for  in New Zealand's National Provincial Championship. He also plays for the New England Free Jacks in Major League Rugby (MLR) in the United States.

References

External links
NZ Rugby History profile
itsrugby.co.uk profile

1996 births
Living people
People educated at St. Patrick's College, Silverstream
Rugby union players from Masterton
New Zealand rugby union players
Rugby union props
Canterbury rugby union players
Wellington rugby union players
Hawke's Bay rugby union players
New England Free Jacks players